Chi Chern (birth name Zhōu Míngtiān) (born in 1955) was the first appointed Dharma heir of renowned Chan Master Sheng-yen. He is also one of the most respected meditation teachers in Malaysia and Singapore. Born in Malaysia and ordained as a monk by Master Chuk Mor in Penang, he later went to Taiwan to study at Fo Guang Shan Institute of Chinese Buddhism.

In 1980, he participated in four-weeks-retreats led by Sheng-yen. It was during this retreat that he had his deep spiritual experience. After his experience was confirmed by Sheng-yen, he went back to Malaysia and started to teach Buddhism. Five years later, he returned to Taiwan and received dharma transmission from Sheng-yen. His Dharma name is 'Chuan Xian Jian Mi ("transmitting the exoteric, seeing the esoteric").

Chi Chern Fa Shi currently resides in Malaysia and is the principal of the Malaysian Buddhist Institute.

See also
 Sheng-yen
 Dharma Drum Mountain

References

External links

https://web.archive.org/web/20110718113446/http://www.worldchinesewriters.com/my/index2.php?option=com_content&task=view&id=86&pop=1&page=0
http://www.ccmati.com

Chan Buddhist monks
Dharma Drum Mountain
Living people
1955 births
Malaysian Buddhist monks
Malaysian people of Chinese descent